HRC Culinary Academy is an accredited culinary school in Sofia, Bulgaria. Founded in February 2008, the academy has more than 300 full-time students from 18 nations. HRC Culinary Academy is the first culinary school in Eastern Europe.

Curriculum 
The Academy's Culinary Arts program is a two-year course that prepares students for careers in the international hotel and culinary industry. The course focuses on hands-on training. The HRC Culinary Academy program covers a curriculum from knife skills and sauce-making to budgeting and menu engineering. Classes are taught by international chef instructors and guest chefs from around the world. The instruction language at the HRC Culinary Academy is English.

Students at the academy have the opportunity to work in restaurant or hotel kitchens during their two paid industry placements in Europe, Middle East, South Africa   and the United States.

Campus 
HRC Academy facilities include training kitchens, a fine dining restaurant, a la carte kitchen, demonstration theatre, wine cellar and culinary library. The HRC Academy features branch locations in Bulgaria's capital Sofia.

References

External links 
 HRC Culinary Academy website
 Training Restaurant by HRC Culinary Academy

Cooking schools in Europe
Education in Sofia
Hospitality schools
Educational institutions established in 2008
Schools in Bulgaria
Bulgarian cuisine
2008 establishments in Bulgaria